These are the full results of the athletics competition at the 2022 South American Games which took place between 12 and 15 October 2022, in Asunción, Paraguay.

Men's results

100 meters

Heats – October 13Wind:Heat 1: -1.2 m/s, Heat 2: +0.4 m/s

Final – October 13Wind: -1.3 m/s

200 meters

Heats – October 14Wind:Heat 1: +1.1 m/s, Heat 2: +1.4 m/s

Final – October 14Wind: -0.5 m/s

400 meters

Heats – October 12

Final – October 13

800 meters
October 15

1500 meters
October 13

5000 meters
October 12

10,000 meters
October 14

Marathon
October 15

110 meters hurdles
October 13Wind: -0.1 m/s

400 meters hurdles

Heats – October 13

Final – October 14

3000 meters steeplechase
October 15

4 × 100 meters relay
14 October

4 × 400 meters relay
15 October

20 kilometers walk
October 12

35 kilometers walk
October 14

High jump
October 13

Pole vault
October 15

Long jump
October 12

Triple jump
October 14

Shot put
October 14

Discus throw
October 15

Hammer throw
October 12

Javelin throw
October 13

Decathlon
October 12–13

Women's results

100 meters

Heats – October 13Wind:Heat 1: -0.9 m/s, Heat 2: -0.3 m/s

Final – October 13Wind: 0.0 m/s

200 meters

Heats – October 14Wind:Heat 1: +1.0 m/s, Heat 2: +0.2 m/s

Final – October 14Wind: -0.3 m/s

400 meters
October 13

800 meters
October 15

1500 meters
October 13

5000 meters
October 14

10,000 meters
October 14

Marathon
October 15

100 meters hurdles
October 13Wind: +0.2 m/s

400 meters hurdles
October 14

3000 meters steeplechase
October 15

4 × 100 meters relay
14 October

4 × 400 meters relay
15 October

20 kilometers walk
October 12

35 kilometers walk
October 14

High jump
October 12

Pole vault
October 14

Long jump
October 13

Triple jump
October 14

Shot put
October 14

Discus throw
October 14

Hammer throw
October 12

Javelin throw
October 13

Heptathlon
October 14–15

Mixed

4 × 400 meters relay
12 October

References

Results
Live results

South American Games
2022
Athl